William Joseph Kelly (May 1, 1886 – June 3, 1940) was an American professional baseball player. He played in parts of four seasons in Major League Baseball for the St. Louis Cardinals and Pittsburgh Pirates from  through . He also managed the minor league Port Huron Saints in 1922. Kelly was born in Baltimore, Maryland and died of lung cancer in Detroit, Michigan at the age of 54.

In a brief 4 year, 104 game major league career, Kelly compiled a .290 batting average with 32 runs, 1 home run and 21 RBI.

External links

Major League Baseball catchers
St. Louis Cardinals players
Pittsburgh Pirates players
Minor league baseball managers
Baseball players from Baltimore
1886 births
1940 deaths
Sioux City Soos players
Evansville River Rats players
Springfield Babes (baseball) players
Fort Wayne Billikens players
Dayton Veterans players
Cedar Rapids Rabbits players
St. Paul Saints (AA) players
Toronto Maple Leafs (International League) players
Freeport Pretzels players